Justin Melck (born 4 January 1983) is a South African born German rugby union player. He plays as a Flanker.

Early life
Melck was born in Cape Town and educated at Rondebosch Boys High School, Fettes College in Scotland and Stellenbosch University,

Career in South Africa
Melck has played for Western Province and the Super Rugby side Stormers.

Melck captained the Western Province side during the Currie Cup tournament in July 2007.

Munster
He has signed a three-month loan deal with European Champions Munster.

Saracens
Melck joined Saracens March 2009 and left at the end of the 2013-14 season.

Personal life
He got married on 6 February 2010 to Georgina Simpson.

Germany
Melck was eligible to play for Germany because of his German mother, was called up for their match against Sweden on 26 April 2014 where he represents the country for the first time.

References

External links
Stormers Profile
SA Rugby Profile

Rugby union flankers
South African rugby union players
Stormers players
Munster Rugby players
Western Province (rugby union) players
Alumni of Rondebosch Boys' High School
People educated at Fettes College
Stellenbosch University alumni
1983 births
Living people
German rugby union players
Germany international rugby union players
Rugby union players from Cape Town